This is a list of monuments in Kathmandu District, Nepal as officially recognized by and available through the website of the Department of Archaeology, Nepal. Kathmandu is a district of Bagmati Province and is located in central northern Nepal. It includes Kathmandu Metropolitan City, the capital of Nepal. The district is a historically rich area and Hindu temples are the main attraction.

Lists per administrative subdivision of Kathmandu District

Kathmandu District consists of 10 municipalities and 1 metropolitan city. Kathmandu Metropolitan City is administratively subdivided into 32 wards.

See also 
 List of monuments in Bagmati Province
 List of monuments in Nepal

References

External links

Kathmandu
 
 
Kathmandu-related lists